Darren Diggs (born 1999/2000), known professionally as DigDat, is a British rapper from Deptford, London. His single "Air Force" peaked at number 20 on the UK Singles Chart following the release of the remix featuring Krept and Konan and K-Trap; this was the first time one of his tracks had entered the top 20. His next single, "No Cap" with Loski, peaked at number 51.

Career

2018–2020: Beginnings and Ei8ht Mile 
Diggs began rapping in 2018, under the name "DigDat". He gained recognition with his single "Air Force", which entered the UK Singles Chart at number 93 in September 2018. A remix of the track with features from Krept and Konan and K Trap was released in the following months; the track then peaked at number 20 in December 2018.

He released his debut album, Ei8ht Mile, on 17 January 2020, including features from K Trap, D-Block Europe, Tee Grizzley, Aitch, and others. It peaked at number 12 on the UK Albums Chart.

2020–2022: Pain Built
In 2020, DigDat appeared on "808" by Da Beatfreakz, which also featured Dutchavelli and B Young. It peaked at number 20 on the UK Singles Chart. In 2021, he released "How High", which peaked at number 90.

In December 2021, DigDat announced Pain Built; it was released on 14 January 2022. A review of the mixtape by GRM Daily said the mixtape "feels as if it is a step in the right direction for both DigDat and UK drill."

Legal issues
At the age of 13, Diggs was sentenced to 10 years in prison. He was released in 2018 after serving 5 years.

Discography

Mixtapes

Singles

As lead artist

As featured artist

Other charted and certified songs

References 

1999 births
Living people
People from Lewisham
Rappers from London
English male rappers
Gangsta rappers
UK drill musicians
British trap musicians